The men's 81 kilograms competition at the 2022 World Weightlifting Championships was held on 10 and 11 December 2022.

Schedule

Medalists

Records

Results

References

Men's 81 kg